Muhammad bin Ismail Nashtakin ad-Darazi was an 11th-century Ismaili preacher and early leader of the Druze faith who was labeled a heretic in 1016 and subsequently executed in 1018 by the Fatimid Caliph Al-Hakim bi-Amr Allah.

Life

Little information is known about the early life of Ad-Darazi. According to most sources, he was born in Bukhara. He is believed to have been of Persian origins and his title ad-Darazi is Persian – meaning 'the tailor'. He arrived in Cairo in 1015, or 1017, after which he joined the newly emerged Druze movement.

Ad-Darazi was converted to be one of the early preachers of the Unity faith (which became known as the Druze faith). At that time, the movement enlisted a large number of adherents. However, he was later considered a renegade  and is usually described by the Druze as following the traits of satan, in particular, arrogance.

This view is based on the observation that as the number of his followers grew, he became obsessed with his leadership and gave himself the title “The Sword of the Faith”. In the Epistles of Wisdom, Hamza ibn-'Ali ibn-Ahmad warns Ad-Darazi, saying, “Faith does not need a sword to aid it.” However, Ad-Darazi ignored Hamza's warnings and continued to challenge the Imam. This attitude led to disputes between Ad-Darazi and Hamza ibn-'Ali ibn-Ahmad, who disliked his behaviour. Ad-Darazi argued that he should be the leader of the Da’wa rather than Hamza ibn Ali and gave himself the title “Lord of the Guides”, because Caliph al-Hakim referred to Hamza as “Guide of the Consented”.

By 1018, ad-Darazi had gathered around him partisans – "Darazites" – who believed that universal reason became incarnated in Adam at the beginning of the world, was then passed from him to the prophets, then into Ali and hence into his descendants, the Fatimid Caliphs. Ad-Darazi wrote a book laying out this doctrine. He read from his book in the principal mosque in Cairo, which caused riots and protests against his claims and many of his followers were killed. Hamza ibn Ali refuted his ideology calling him "the insolent one and Satan". The controversy created by ad-Darazi led Caliph al-Hakim to suspend the Druze da'wa in 1018 AD.

In an attempt to gain the support of al-Hakim, ad-Darazi started preaching that al-Hakim and his ancestors were the incarnation of God.

It is believed that ad-Darazi allowed wine, forbidden marriages and taught metempsychosis although it has been argued that his actions might have been exaggerated by contemporary and later historians and polemicists.

Death

An inherently modest man, al-Hakim did not believe that he was God, and felt ad-Darazi was trying to depict himself as a new prophet. Al-Hakim preferred Hamza ibn 'Ali ibn Ahmad over him and Ad-Darazi was executed in 1018, leaving Hamza the sole leader of the new faith.

Aftermath

Even though the Druze do not consider ad-Darazi the founder of their faith (rather, they refer to him as their "first heretic"), rival Muslim groups purposely attached the name of the controversial preacher to the new sect and it has stuck with them ever since. Druze refer to themselves as "unitarians" (al-Muwahhidūn).

See also
Divine call
Rasa'il al-hikmah
Hamza ibn-'Ali ibn-Ahmad
Baha’ud-Dīn as-Samuqī

References

10th-century births
1018 deaths
11th-century Iranian people
11th-century people from the Fatimid Caliphate
Druze religious leaders
Founders of religions
People from Bukhara
People executed by the Fatimid Caliphate
Prophets in the Druze faith
Iranian Ismailis
11th-century Ismailis